The Hekla 3 eruption (H-3) circa 1000 BC is considered the most severe eruption of Hekla during the Holocene. It threw about 7.3 km3 of volcanic rock into the atmosphere, placing its Volcanic Explosivity Index (VEI) at 5. This would have caused a volcanic winter, cooling temperatures in the Northern Hemisphere for several years afterwards.

An eighteen-year span of global cooling that is recorded in Irish bog oaks has been attributed to H-3. The eruption is detectable in Greenland ice cores, the bristlecone pine sequence, and the Irish oak sequence of extremely narrow growth rings. Andy Baker's team of researchers dated it to 1021 BC ±130.

A "high chronology" (earlier) interpretation of the above results is preferred by Baker, based also on growth of stalagmites. In Sutherland, northwest Scotland, a spurt of four years of doubled annual luminescent growth banding of calcite in a stalagmite is datable to 1135 BC ±130.

A rival, "low-chronology" interpretation of the eruption has been made by Andrew Dugmore: 2879 BP (929 BC ±34). In 1999, Dugmore suggested a non-volcanic explanation for the Scottish results. In 2000 skepticism concerning conclusions about connecting Hekla 3 and Hekla 4 (probably 2310 BC ±20) with paleoenvironmental events and archaeologically attested abandonment of settlement sites in northern Scotland was expressed by John P. Grattan and David D. Gilbertson. Some Egyptologists have firmly dated the eruption to 1159 BC, and blamed it for famines under Ramesses III during the wider Bronze Age collapse. Dugmore has rebutted this dating. Other scholars have held off on this dispute, preferring the neutral and vague "3000 BP".

See also
 Geography of Iceland
 Iceland plume
 Iceland hotspot
 List of volcanoes in Iceland
 Volcanism of Iceland

References 

11th century BC
2nd-millennium BC natural events
East Volcanic Zone of Iceland
Hekla
Late Bronze Age collapse
Plinian eruptions
Prehistoric volcanic events
Hekla 3
Volcanic eruptions in Iceland
Volcanic winters